Julio Andres Arce (born October 27, 1989) is an American mixed martial artist. He was the former Ring of Combat bantamweight and featherweight champion. He also won the Golden Gloves 2011 Championship. Arce currently competes in the Bantamweight division in the UFC.

Background
Arce was born in Florida but moved to Colombia as a child, returning stateside around the age of ten. He graduated from Benjamin N. Cardozo High School and got his associate degree in business afterwards.

At fourteen and weighing 200 pounds, Arce joined Team Tiger Schulmann combat gym to lose weight. He started training, competed in kickboxing, and won the New York Golden Gloves championship in 2011 in boxing prior to transitioning to MMA in 2012.

Mixed martial arts career

Early career 
Arce started his professional MMA career since 2012 and fought most of his fights in Ring of Combat promotion and he was the bantamweight and featherweight champion. He amassed a record of 8–1 before signed by UFC.

Dana White's Contender Series 
Arce appeared in Dana White's Contender Series 5 web-series program. He faced Peter Petties and won the fight via technical knockout. Even with the win, Arce was not awarded a UFC contract at that event. However, he was later signed by the UFC on short notice to replace an injured Charles Rosa at UFC 220.

Ultimate Fighting Championship
Arce made his UFC debut on January 20, 2018 against Dan Ige, replacing an injured Charles Rosa at UFC 220.  He won the fight via unanimous decision with the scoreboard of (30-27, 30–27, 29–28).

His next fight came on June 1, 2018 at UFC Fight Night 131 against Daniel Teymur.  He won the fight via a rear-naked choke in the third round.

Arce faced Sheymon Moraes on November 3, 2018 at UFC 230. He lost the fight via split decision.

Arce faced Julian Erosa on May 18, 2019 at UFC Fight Night 152. He won the fight via knockout in the third round.

Arce faced Hakeem Dawodu on November 2, 2019 at UFC 244. He lost the fight by split decision.

Arce was expected to face Timur Valiev on a bantamweight bout on February 6, 2021 at UFC Fight Night 184. However, Arce was removed from the event in late January due to undisclosed reasons and replaced by Martin Day.

Arce faced Andre Ewell on July 24, 2021 at UFC on ESPN: Sandhagen vs. Dillashaw. He won in the second round via technical knockout.

Arce faced Song Yadong on November 13, 2021 at UFC Fight Night 197.  He lost the fight via technical knockout in round two.

As the first fight of his new four-fight contract, Arce faced Daniel Santos on April 9, 2022 at UFC 273. At the weigh-ins, Arce weighed in at 136.5 pounds, half a pound over the bantamweight non-title fight limit. The bout proceed at a catchweight and he will forfeit 20% of his purse which will go to his opponent Daniel Santos. He won the bout via unanimous decision.

Arce faced Montel Jackson on November 12, 2022, at UFC 281. He lost the fight via unanimous decision.

Arce was scheduled to face Cody Garbrandt on March 4, 2023 at UFC 285. However, Arce withdrew in late January due to a knee injury and was replaced by Trevin Jones.

Championships and accomplishments

Mixed martial arts 
Ring of Combat
Ring of Combat Bantamweight Champion (one time; former)
Three successful title defenses
Right of Combat Featherweight Champion (one time; former)
Two successful title defenses

Boxing 
Golden Gloves
Golden Gloves 2011 Champion

Personal life 
Arce works as an MMA instructor at Tiger Schulmann sport gym at Queens.

Mixed martial arts record

|-
|Loss
|align=center|18–6
|Montel Jackson
|Decision (unanimous)
|UFC 281
| 
|align=center|3
|align=center|5:00
|New York City, New York, United States
|
|-
|Win
|align=center|18–5
|Daniel Santos
|Decision (unanimous)
|UFC 273
|
|align=center|3
|align=center|5:00
|Jacksonville, Florida, United States
|
|-
|Loss
|align=center|17–5
|Song Yadong
|TKO (head kick and punches)
|UFC Fight Night: Holloway vs. Rodríguez
|
|align=center|2
|align=center|1:35
|Las Vegas, Nevada, United States
|
|-
|Win
|align=center|17–4
|Andre Ewell
|TKO (punches)
|UFC on ESPN: Sandhagen vs. Dillashaw
|
|align=center|2
|align=center|3:45
|Las Vegas, Nevada, United States
|
|-
|Loss
|align=center|16–4
|Hakeem Dawodu
|Decision (split)
|UFC 244 
|
|align=center|3
|align=center|5:00
|New York City, New York, United States
|
|-
|Win
|align=center|16–3
|Julian Erosa
|KO (head kick)
|UFC Fight Night: dos Anjos vs. Lee 
|
|align=center|3
|align=center|1:49
|Rochester, New York, United States
|
|-
|Loss
|align=center|15–3
|Sheymon Moraes
|Decision (split)
|UFC 230
|
|align=center|3
|align=center|5:00
|New York City, New York, United States
|
|-
|Win
|align=center|15–2
|Daniel Teymur
|Submission (rear-naked choke)
|UFC Fight Night: Rivera vs. Moraes
|
|align=center|3
|align=center|2:55
|Utica, New York, United States
|
|-
|Win
|align=center|14–2
|Dan Ige
|Decision (unanimous)
|UFC 220
|
|align=center|3
|align=center|5:00
|Boston, Massachusetts, United States
|
|-
|Win
|align=center|13–2
|Peter Petties
|TKO (punches)
|Dana White's Contender Series 5
|
|align=center|2
|align=center|2:39
|Las Vegas, Nevada, United States
|
|-
|Win
|align=center|12–2
|Tim Dooling
|Decision (unanimous)
|ROC 59
|
|align=center|3
|align=center|5:00
|Atlantic City, New Jersey, United States
|
|-
|Win
|align=center|11–2
|Frank Buenafuente
|Submission (rear-naked choke)
|ROC 58
|
|align=center|2
|align=center|N/A
|Atlantic City, New Jersey, United States
|
|-
|Win
|align=center|10–2
|Frank Buenafuente
|Decision
|ROC 57
|
|align=center|3
|align=center|5:00
|Atlantic City, New Jersey, United States
|
|-
|Win
|align=center|9–2
|Francisco Isata
|Submission (rear-naked choke)
|CFFC 60
|
|align=center|2
|align=center|3:16
|Atlantic City, New Jersey, United States
|
|-
|Loss
|align=center|8–2
|Brian Kelleher
|Submission (guillotine choke)
|ROC 54
|
|align=center|3
|align=center|0:18
|Atlantic City, New Jersey, United States
|
|-
|Loss
|align=center|8–1
|Brian Kelleher
|Decision (majority)
|ROC 52
|
|align=center|3
|align=center|5:00
|Atlantic City, New Jersey, United States
|
|-
|Win
|align=center| 8–0
|Michael Imperato
|Decision (unanimous)
|ROC 51
|
|align=center|3 
|align=center|5:00 
|Atlantic City, New Jersey, United States
|
|-
|Win
|align=center| 7–0
|Thomas Vasquez
|TKO (punches)
|ROC 50
|
|align=center|3 
|align=center|3:46 
|Atlantic City, New Jersey, United States
|
|-
|Win
|align=center| 6–0
|Jake Grigson
|Submission (rear-naked choke)
|ROC 49
|
|align=center|1
|align=center|2:20 
|Atlantic City, New Jersey, United States
|
|-
|Win
|align=center| 5–0
|Jason McLean
|Decision (unanimous)
|ROC 47
|
|align=center|3 
|align=center|5:00
|Atlantic City, New Jersey, United States
|
|-
|Win
|align=center| 4–0
|Corey Simmons
|Submission (rear-naked hoke)
|ROC 46
|
|align=center| 2
|align=center| 3:49
|Atlantic City, New Jersey, United States
|
|-
|Win
|align=center|3–0
|Dennis Dombrow
|Decision (unanimous)
|ROC 45
|
|align=center|3
|align=center|5:00
|Atlantic City, New Jersey, United States
|
|-
|Win
|align=center|2–0
|Umaer Haq
|Decision (unanimous)
|Xtreme Caged Combat: Backlash
|
|align=center|3
|align=center|5:00
|Philadelphia, Pennsylvania, United States
|
|-
|Win
|align=center|1–0
|Kenneth Nagle
|KO (punches)
|Matrix Fights 6
|
|align=center|1
|align=center|1:46
|Philadelphia, Pennsylvania, United States
|
|-

See also
List of current UFC fighters
List of male mixed martial artists

References

External links
 
 

1995 births
Living people
American male mixed martial artists
Bantamweight mixed martial artists
Lightweight mixed martial artists
Mixed martial artists utilizing boxing
Mixed martial artists from Florida
Mixed martial artists utilizing Brazilian jiu-jitsu
Ultimate Fighting Championship male fighters
American male boxers
Boxers from Florida
American practitioners of Brazilian jiu-jitsu
Sportspeople from Miami
American people of Colombian descent